Jhumra may refer to:
Jhumra or Jhoomra a Hindustani music tala 
Chak Jhumra, Chak Jhumra is a town and tehsil near the city of Faisalabad, Punjab, Pakistan